War and Destiny (Traditional Chinese: 亂世佳人) is a TVB period drama series released overseas in July 2006 and broadcast on TVB Jade Channel in March 2007.

Production note
The background of the plot is set in the Nanjing during World War II, and the characters live through the infamous Rape of Nanjing.  The Chinese title for this series shares the same Chinese name with the 1939 film Gone with the Wind.  To fit the general ratings on TVB, the series toned down much of the violence and bloodshed.

Synopsis
The Ku family are living in the Republic of China era (1930s) as a prestigious household in a wealthy part of Nanjing.  Soon, words spread that the city is being taken over by Imperial Japanese forces.  The Ku family, which had all daughters and a father and mother of weakening health, are soon forced to pack their belongings to leave the war torn area.  One of their servants recommends they move to the rural areas.  To their dismay, life is incredibly difficult and they live in poverty.  The family is in pieces as each daughter struggles with numerous difficulties in the countryside. However, all members of the family eventually grow closer together as they work in the rural area.

Eventually, Nanjing falls to Japan. One of the daughters, Ping-On, was shocked to find out that Hao-Yee, a childhood friend, is actually the son of Japanese military officer Chung Tin-Ngai (Shek Sau). She also discovers that Hao-Yee, whom she considers to be her fiancé, is actually in love with Cheng Yuet-Fung (Leila Tong), the 4th wife of her father.  Meanwhile, he is also treated as a spy and traitor by all the Chinese villagers he grew up with.  In the end Ping-On unexpectedly falls in love with Poon Sai-Cheung (Sunny Chan) whom she had first hated with a passion and believed to be a traitor…

Cast

Comparison with reality
 The Japanese troops did not commit much atrocities in the series.  The killing was portrayed in a manner that was often quick and very clean.  Especially during the grave scene where the hundreds of innocent citizens were buried, the bodies were all intact.
 In the story Ku Man-Chai had 4 wives, each trying to give birth to a male son. Up until the 1930s Republic of China era, this was common practice in the culture. And was a major problem in China up until it was fixed by the more extreme One Child Policy.
 The earlier Ku family owned a private truck, while Poon Sai-Cheung owned a Rolls-Royce. Both attempted to escape war-torn Nanking by car, while the other 99% of the population escaped on foot. This demonstrates the huge wealth gap between the rich and poor.

Viewership ratings

Awards and nominations
40th TVB Anniversary Awards (2007)
 "Best Drama"
 "Best Actress in a Leading Role" (Myolie Wu - Ku Ping-On)
 "Best Actor in a Supporting Role" (Lau Dan - Ku Man-Chai)
 "Best Actor in a Supporting Role" (Bill Chan - Chung Tin-Ngai)
 "Most Improved Actress" (Leila Tong - Cheng Yuet-Fung)
 "My Favourite Female Character Role" (Myolie Wu - Ku Ping-On)

References

External links
TVB.com War and Destiny - Official Website 
Butterfly's Place.net War and Destiny - Synopsis 

TVB dramas
2007 Hong Kong television series debuts
2007 Hong Kong television series endings
Television shows set in Nanjing